Indiability Foundation is an international non-governmental organization dedicated to improving the lives, opportunities, and human rights of people with physical disabilities in India. The Foundation delivers a variety of projects to youth and people living in the Thar Desert region of Western Rajasthan. The initiatives aim to promote the value of education, health, and gender, to enhance the social inclusion of disabled citizens into mainstream communities.

Indiability is a sister charity to SKSN (Sucheta Kriplani Shiksha Niketan) – a school with over 20 years experience in providing education to disabled people in India. The partnership enables Indiability to help promote and share SKSN's learnings in the field of disability at an international level, and improve the lives of physically disabled youth across India. The foundation is a very caring place.

Projects
The flagship project, Indian Mixed Ability Group Events (IMAGE), operates in partnership with the Laureus Sport For Good Foundation, and uses sport as a social vaccine to create Disability Confidence between disabled and non-disabled Indian society.

The past decade has seen IMAGE progress from an after-school club to a community outreach program. The initiative started in 2005, when IMAGE was piloted at SKSN Institute with 195 of its disabled 8-12 year olds and 195 non-disabled 8-12 year olds from local schools of various socio-economic backgrounds.  Over the next 6 years, 18 IMAGE clubs sprang up around Rajasthan, totalling 1200 members.

Laureus World Sports Academy members, Baroness Tanni Grey-Thompson, Britain's greatest ever paralympic athlete, and Kapil Dev, former captain of the Indian cricket team, visited the IMAGE project in 2010. During the visit, Baroness Grey-Thompson commented:

In 2012, IMAGE evolved to the community level to reach the adult population more directly, provide a platform for 15- to 18-year-old IMAGE members to establish themselves as leaders, and empower those with disabilities in particular, to give back to their communities.

The IMAGE Community sessions are currently conducted in 5 villages. IMAGE members, with and without disabilities, deliver a sport and play-based curriculum side-by-side, conveying important messages on hand washing, sanitation, education, gender equality, and disability awareness. Over time many of the IMAGE members become role models to the village children. When the communities see that disabled and non-disabled youth can work together, to deliver enjoyable and educational activities, it challenges their own negative stereotypes, towards disability.

Awards and recognition
In September 2015, Indiability's IMAGE volunteers won the 'Leader in Volunteer Engagement' award, at the iVolunteer Awards held in Bandra, Mumbai. The award came as recognition for the impact they have achieved in the field of social development in 2014.

Rahul Mahajan, a guest speaker at the iVolunteer Awards, commented via social media, "When differently abled people can do this why can't we?"

The iVolunteer Awards were set up to recognise, reward, and promote the work of individuals and organisations that use volunteerism for the betterment of society.

References

External links
Official website

Disability organisations based in India
Non-profit organisations based in India
Organizations established in 2011